Torat Hamelekh is a controversial Jewish book that "discusses the circumstances in which Jews would be allowed by Jewish law to kill gentiles, based on a selective reading of Jewish texts".

References 

Jewish ethics
Books about Judaism
2009 non-fiction books
Judaism-related controversies
Jewish fundamentalism